Maria das Graças Rallo (born 10 May 1948), known by her stage name Cláudya, and formerly Cláudia and Cláudia Oliveira, is a Brazilian singer.

Biography 
She debuted at age nine in a talent show at Radio Company of Juiz de Fora, where she grew up. At thirteen, she was a singer at many of the midnight feasts and dances of the region. She developed her career in São Paulo in the 60s, at the beginning, participating in the program O Fino da Bossa. In 1969, she won the Festival Song Fluminense, singing the song "Razão de Paz para Não Cantar" (Lage and Alesio Eduardo de Barros). She also participated in several festivals abroad, including Japan, Greece, Spain, Mexico, and Venezuela, becoming the most awarded singer outside Brazil.

She excelled in the music scene in 1982 with the song "Don't Cry for Me Argentina" from the musical Evita.

She has recorded over twenty albums and has huge record sales. Thanks to her great success, she was invited to participate in major television programs of the time. She launched an LP in Japanese, which sold over 200,000 copies and among the prizes won were the Roquette Pinto, the Golden Globe and Trophy Press. Among her biggest hits is the song "Com Mais de Trinta", a composition of Marcos Valle and Paulo Sérgio Valle.

Trivia 

Claudya also plays piano and keyboard, from the age of 23. She is the mother of singer Graziela Medori.

Discography 
 1967 – Cláudia 
 1971 – Cláudia 
 1971 – Jesus Cristo 
 1971 – Você, Cláudia, Você 
 1973 – Deixa eu Dizer 
 1977 – Reza, Tambor e Raça 
 1979 – Pássaro Imigrante 
 1980 – Cláudia 
 1985 – Luz da Vida 
 1986 – Sentimentos 
 1992 – A Estranha Dama 
 1994 – Leão de Judá 
 1994 – Entre Amigos (with Zimbo Trio) 
 1998 – Cláudya Canta Taiguara 
 1999 – Brasil Rea'l 
 2005 – Horizons
 2011 – Senhor do Tempo – Canções Raras de Caetano Veloso
 2016 – Para Sempre Amanhecer – Duo Tiago Mineiro

External links 
 Biography at Dicionário Cravo Albin

References 

Brazilian sopranos
Living people
1948 births
Bossa nova singers
Musicians from Rio de Janeiro (city)
20th-century Brazilian women singers
20th-century Brazilian singers
21st-century Brazilian women singers
21st-century Brazilian singers
Women in Latin music